Lethrinops micrentodon is a species of cichlid endemic to Lake Malawi.  This species grows to a length of  TL.  It can also be found in the aquarium trade.

References

micrentodon
Fish of Lake Malawi
Fish of Malawi
Fish described in 1922
Taxa named by Charles Tate Regan
Taxonomy articles created by Polbot